The Malay is a breed of game chicken.
The Malay is bred principally in Europe, and in Australia and the United States. It was derived, partly in Devon and Cornwall in south-west England, from birds imported from Indian subcontinent or South-east Asia in the first decades of the nineteenth century, when large birds of this type were widespread in northern India, in Indonesia and in the Malay Peninsula.

The Malay was the first chicken breed to be bantamised; a dwarf version of the standard-sized breed was created at the turn of the twentieth century.

History

From about 1830 very large game chickens were imported to England, where they became fashionable and were selectively bred by English breeders. Some imports are documented from the Malay Peninsula, others from the Deccan of India. Those from India were sometimes called Grey Chittagongs, but were considered to be closely similar to the Malay. They were particularly numerous in Devon and Cornwall, especially in the area round Falmouth, which was a common first port of call for returning East Indiamen. They were also numerous in Ireland, in the area of Dublin.

Malays were shown at the first British poultry exhibition in 1845, and were included in the Standard of Excellence, the first edition of the British Poultry Standards, in 1865.

Malay birds were present in Germany and the Netherlands by about 1834, and by 1846 were introduced to the United States also. The black-breasted red Malay was included in the Standard of Perfection of the American Poultry Association from 1883, and the bantam in 1904; five other colours, both standard- and bantam-sized, were added in 1981. Numbers of the breed in the USA are very low; its conservation status is listed as "critical" by the FAO.

Characteristics

The Malay has an upright stance, a well muscled form and a large skull. Nowadays they are selected to be better egg-layers than in the 1970s with 70 to 120 eggs annually for a young hen and older hens laying only 30 to 55 eggs.

Use

Today, in the West the Malay is mainly kept for participation in poultry shows by breeders. It is considered a hard-feathered, gamefowl breed.

Malay chickens have been used in Brazil for the creation of the Índio Gigante Chicken.

References

See also
 List of chicken breeds

Chicken breeds
Chicken breeds originating in Malaysia
Animal breeds on the RBST Watchlist